This is a list of the songs that reached number one in Argentina in 1961, according to Billboard magazine with data provided by Rubén Machado's "Escalera a la fama".

Chart history

See also
1961 in music

References

Sources
Print editions of the Billboard magazine.

1961 in Argentina
Argentina
1961